The Bronze Bride is a 1917 American silent drama film directed by Henry MacRae and starring Claire McDowell, Frank Mayo, and Edward Clark.

Cast
 Claire McDowell as A-Che-Chee
 Frank Mayo as Harvey Ogden
 Edward Clark as William Ogden
 Charles Hill Mailes as Joe Dubois
 Eddie Polo as White Feather
 Harry Archer as Black Lynx
 Winter Hall as Mr. Carter
 Betty Schade as His Daughter
 Frankie Lee as A-Che-Chee's Child

References

Bibliography
 Ingraham, Chrys. White Weddings: Romancing Heterosexuality in Popular Culture. Routledge, 2009.

External links

1917 films
1917 drama films
1910s English-language films
American silent feature films
Silent American drama films
American black-and-white films
Universal Pictures films
Films directed by Henry MacRae
1910s American films